The Sentinel is a daily regional newspaper circulating in the North Staffordshire and South Cheshire areas of England. It is owned by Reach plc and based at Hanley, Stoke-on-Trent.

It is the only newspaper delivering daily news and features on professional football clubs Stoke City, Port Vale and Crewe Alexandra. The Sentinel also operates a website with sections on news, sport and entertainment, as well as a comprehensive directory of local businesses.

The publication, which became a morning paper in 2009, is printed from Monday to Saturday.

Circulation area
The Sentinel'''s patch includes the six towns of The Potteries (Hanley, Burslem, Tunstall, Fenton, Longton and Stoke), Newcastle-under-Lyme, Leek, Cheadle, Cheddleton, Crewe, Nantwich, Alsager, Sandbach, Stafford, Stone, Biddulph, Congleton and Eccleshall.

From 29 June 2015 to 3 January 2016 it had an average daily circulation of 30,957, down from 33,426 from 29 December 2014 to 28 June 2015, and 35,112 during the six months before that.

History
In 1854, The Staffordshire Sentinel and Commercial and General Advertiser was first published as a Liberal weekly newspaper from offices in Cheapside, Hanley, on 7 January. The publisher was Hugh Roberts, the Editor Thomas Phillips, a former Northampton bookseller and printer. One of the objects of the publishers was to campaign for the incorporation of Hanley, but news of the whole pottery district was contained in its columns. The initial price was 3d. By 1873: The Staffordshire Daily Sentinel was introduced at a halfpenny on Tuesday 15 April, publishing daily editions from Monday to Friday, with the Weekly Sentinel, at two pence, continuing to appear on Saturday. The Sentinel was the first daily paper to be published in the Potteries. In 1898, the new paper was registered as the Staffordshire Sentinel Ltd. 

In 2007 the broadsheet Sentinel Sunday ceased production in 2007. In 2012: Local World acquired the Sentinel'', along with other newspapers owned by Northcliffe Media, from the Daily Mail and General Trust. In 2015, the Sentinel's parent company, Local World, was acquired by the Trinity Mirror Group.

The newspaper was based at Sentinel House on Bethesda Street, Hanley. In 2021, Reach PLC announced the office would close with all journalists subsequently working from home.

Marc Waddington became the editor in 2020.

References

Further reading

Companies based in Stoke-on-Trent
Mass media in Stoke-on-Trent
Newspapers published in Staffordshire
Northcliffe Media
Publications established in 1854
1854 establishments in England
Daily newspapers published in the United Kingdom
Newspapers published by Reach plc